The Figarella is a small coastal river in the northwest of the department of Haute-Corse, Corsica, France.

Course

It crosses the communes of Calenzana, Calvi and Moncale.
The river rises as the Ruisseau de Spasimata in the commune of Calenzana to the northeast of the  Punta Mazagnu in the Monte Cinto massif and flows northwest. 
The Figarella proper forms when the Spasimata is joined by the Rau de Melaghia from the north.
It turns to the north and flows between the villages of Suare and Tarazone, then along the east side of the Calvi – Sainte-Catherine Airport.
It is joined by the Ronca river from the left just north of the airport, then by the Campu Longu stream from the right before entering the sea just west of Camp Raffalli.

Human impacts

In the late 19th century the decline in agriculture led to croplands and pasture being replaced by wild undergrowth and woods, which reduced the amount of erosion and run-off. 
This in turn led to less sediment being carried to the mouth of the river.
The gravel pit traps sediment, and has caused braided channels to be replaced by a single channel. 
Most of the former channels are now vegetated.
Downstream, the result has been erosion of the beach, which started in the 19th century and is likely to continue for several decades, destroying a tourist attraction.

Hydrology

The Figarella was measured at Calenzana between 1960 and 1976.

Tributaries
The following streams (ruisseaux) are tributaries of the Figarella (ordered by length) and sub-tributaries:

  Campu Longu 
 Novalella 
  Ronca (river) 
 Enferata 
 Campu d'Ava 
 Vespaiu 
 Capu Pianu 
 Signoria 
 Lioli 
 Acqua Viva 
 Campanella 
 Falcunaghia 
 Melaghia 
 Mandriaccia 
 Onda 
 Curzulosu 
 Sambucu 
 Arghioa 
 Catarelle 
 Vivariu 
 Frassigna 
 Vespaghiu 
 Melaghiola 
 Nocaghia 
 Terribule 
 Pelliciani 
 Vignali 
 Meta di Filu 
 Pittinaghia 
 Purcareccia 
 Ladroncellu 
 Valle d'Alloru

Notes

Sources

Rivers of Haute-Corse
Rivers of France
Coastal basins of the Mediterranean Sea in Corsica